Ayres Hall is a central iconic and historic landmark building at the University of Tennessee (UT) in Knoxville, Tennessee.

The building was designed by Miller, Fullenwider and Dowling of Chicago, and completed in 1921. It is named for Brown Ayres (1856–1919), the university's 12th president from 1904–1909. A extensive restoration began in the fall of 2008 and ended in January 2011. The renovations included central  air conditioning and heating, terrazzo floors and benches, faces for the tower's four clocks, refurbished classroom furnishings, such as chairs, tables, and slate chalkboards, and stairways, and a north courtyard. The faces for the clocks and the terrazzo floors were in the original designs, but had never been installed due to costs. The north courtyard, which faces Cumberland Avenue, was never implemented in the original designs.

The distinctive checkerboard feature at the top of the tower has been replicated in UT Orange and white in the endzones at Neyland Stadium and at the ends of the court in Thompson–Boling Arena, both nearby. The building houses the offices of the University's College of Arts and Sciences as well as UT's mathematics department.

References

External links
 Ayres Hall entry on Emporis
 Ayres Hall | SAH ARCHIPEDIA
 Justin C. Dothard. About Face: The Coming of Ayres Hall at the University of Tennessee (additional link)

University of Tennessee campus
School buildings on the National Register of Historic Places in Tennessee
School buildings completed in 1921
Gothic Revival architecture in Tennessee
National Register of Historic Places in Knoxville, Tennessee
1921 establishments in Tennessee